Kimihia is a north-eastern suburb of Huntly, New Zealand.

Education 

References 

Huntly, New Zealand
Waikato District
Populated places in Waikato